Dudley Little may refer to:
 Big Tiny Little (1930–2010), American musician
 Dudley George Little (1914–1972), business owner and politician in British Columbia, Canada